In mathematics, the parabolic cylinder functions are special functions defined as solutions to the differential equation

This equation is found when the technique of separation of variables is used on Laplace's equation when expressed in parabolic cylindrical coordinates.

The above equation may be brought into two distinct forms (A) and (B) by  completing the square and rescaling , called H. F. Weber's equations:

and

If  is a solution, then so are

Solutions

There are independent even and odd solutions of the form. These are given by (following the notation of Abramowitz and Stegun (1965)):

and 

where  is the confluent hypergeometric function.

Other pairs of independent solutions may be formed from linear combinations of the above solutions. One such pair is based upon their behavior at infinity:

where 

and

For half-integer values of a, these (that is, U and V) can be re-expressed in terms of Hermite polynomials; alternatively, they can also be expressed in terms of Bessel functions.

The functions U and V can also be related to the functions  (a notation dating back to Whittaker (1902)) that are themselves sometimes called parabolic cylinder functions:

It can be expressed in terms of confluent hypergeometric functions as

Power series for this function have been obtained by Abadir (1993).

References 

Special hypergeometric functions
Special functions